is a district located in Rumoi Subprefecture, Hokkaido, Japan.

As of 2004, the district has an estimated population of 14,828 and a density of 12.28 persons per km2. The total area is 1,207.03 km2.

Towns and villages
Haboro
Shosanbetsu
Tomamae

Districts in Hokkaido